Synodontis macrophthalmus is a species of upside-down catfish endemic to Ghana where it occurs in the Volta River basin.  This species grows to a length of  TL.

References

External links 

macrophthalmus
Endemic freshwater fish of Ghana
Taxa named by Max Poll
Fish described in 1971